Mehreen Jabbar (Urdu:  م‍ﮩ‍رين جبار  ) (b. 29 December 1971, is a Pakistani film and television director and producer based in New York City. She is a daughter of the Pakistani media-person Javed Jabbar. She is also the niece of Beo Zafar. Mehreen Jabbar is first cousin of famous Pakistani-British singer, actor and director Yasir Akhtar. Active since 1994, Jabbar established herself as one of the prolific directors of the television. Her work for 2008 TV series Doraha earned her Lux Style Award for Best TV Director.

Early life
Born in Karachi, Jabbar grew up around Pakistan's show business. Her father, Javed Jabbar has been a filmmaker, and a very successful ad man apart from being a former Pakistani senator and a cabinet minister. After receiving a BA degree from Saint Joseph's College in Karachi, Jabbar went to the US to study film and completed a two-year program at University of California Los Angeles in 1993, with a Film, Television and Video certificate. She returned to Pakistan, and directed and produced drama series/serials under the banner of TasVeer Productions, almost all of which were critically acclaimed by the Pakistani press.

Career
Jabbar is a Pakistani-American director who is a 25-year veteran of the industry, with a prolific career as Director/Producer of gritty, hard-hitting films and TV series for Pakistani and South Asian Television which have earned her both critical and commercial success.
She has also made a number of narrative shorts that have been screened internationally in film festivals as well as on TV.  Her award-winning short films and TV dramas include Marhoom Colonel Ki Betiyaan, Beauty Parlor, Doraha, and Daam, amongst others. In 2008 Mehreen directed her debut feature film Ramchand Pakistani for which she was awarded the ‘Global Film Initiative Grant’. The film premiered in competition at the Tribeca Film Festival and continued a successful festival run. It was later released theatrically in Pakistan, India and the United Kingdom in 2008-09 to wide critical and audience acclaim. ‘Ramchand Pakistani’ was awarded the ‘Fipresci Prize’ by the ‘International Federation of Film Critics’, the ‘Audience Award’ at the ‘Fribourg Film Festival’, Switzerland and an ‘Honorable Mention’ by the 13th Annual Satyajit Ray Award at the London Film Festival. In 2010, Mehreen was invited to screen her film at the Museum of Modern Art, New York.

Her second feature film Dobara Phir Se which was shot in New York and Karachi had a successful theatrical release in Pakistan, the UK, USA and the UAE in December 2016.

Jabbar has been a member of the National Board of Film Censors in Karachi, a founding member of the KaraFilm Festival in Karachi, Pakistan and a founder member of the NGO WAR (War Against Rape). In 2011, she was invited to the Maisha Film Lab in Uganda - a non-profit training lab founded by director Mira Nair to be a directing mentor. She is the recipient of several awards for her work  and has served as a jury member in many local and international film festivals.

Ramchand Pakistani 
Ramchand Pakistani was Jabbar's first feature-length film, which was released in Pakistan, India and the UK to wide critical and audience acclaim. The film premiered in the competition section of the Tribeca Film Festival in New York in 2008. It won the FIPRESCI PRIZE from the International Federation of Film Critics and received Honourable Mention by the 13th Annual Satyajit Ray Awards at the London Film Festival, 2008 as well as the Audience award at the Fribourg International Film Festival. The film recently had a week-long screening at the MOMA (Museum of Modern Art) in New York.

Jabbar directed the web drama series Ek Jhoothi Love Story which was released on ZEE5 in October 2020.

Filmography

Film

Web series

Television 
{|class="wikitable sortable plainrowheaders"
|-
! Year
! Title
! Notes
|-
|
! scope="row" | Ab Tum Ja Saktey Ho
| 
|-
| 1995
! scope="row" | Farar
| 
|-
| 1998
! scope="row" | Dhoop Mein Sawan
| Mini-series
|-
| 2000
! scope="row" | Aur Zindagi Badalti Hai
| 
|-
| 2001
! scope="row" | Kahaniyaan
| 
|-
|
! scope="row" | Chalo Phir Se Muskurain
|
|-
|
! scope="row" | Afsoon Khawab
|
|-
|
! scope="row" | Beauty Parlor
|
|-
|
! scope="row" | Marhoom Colonel Ki Betiyaan
| 
|-
|
! scope="row" | Deeda-e-Purkhoon
|
|-
|
! scope="row" | Harjai
| 
|-
|
! scope="row" | New York Stories
| 
|-
|
! scope="row" | Lal Baig
| 
|-
|
! scope="row" | Abba Amma Aur Ali
| 
|-
|
! scope="row" | Putli Ghar
| 
|-
|
! scope="row" | Sanam Gazida
|
|-
| 2006
! scope="row" | Pehchaan
| 
|-
| 2008–09
! scope="row" | Doraha
| 
|-
| 2009
! scope="row" | Malaal| 
|-
| rowspan="3" | 2010
! scope="row" | Vasl| 
|-
! scope="row" | Wapsi| Telefilm
|-
! scope="row" | Daam| 
|-
| 2011
! scope="row" | Neeyat|
|-
| rowspan="2" | 2012
! scope="row" | Mata-e-Jaan Hai Tu| 
|-
! scope="row" | Coke Kahani| 
|-
| rowspan="2" | 2013
! scope="row" | Ghoonghat| Telefilm
|-
! scope="row" | Rehaai|
|-
| 2014
! scope="row" | Jackson Heights| 
|-
| 2015
! scope="row" | Mera Naam Yousuf Hai|
|-
| 2019
! scope="row" | Dil Kiya Karay| 
|}

Awards and nominations
 Ramchand Pakistani wins FIPRESCI Award from the International Federation of Film Critics and receives Honourable mention by the 13th Annual Satyajit Ray Awards at the London Film Festival (2008)
 Won – Indus Drama Awards (2004) Best Director for Harjai Won – IndusVision Young Achievers Award (2002)
 Won – Kara Film Festival (2001) Best Director & Best medium-length Film for Daughters of the Late Colonel Won – Pakistan Media Award (2010) Best Drama – Satellite Malal
 Nominated - Hum Awards (2012) Best Director for Mata-e-Jaan Hai Tu
Lux Style Awards

Festival screeningsBeauty Parlor screened at: 
 Hong Kong International Film Festival
 Pusan Film Festival, South Korea
 San Francisco Asian American Film Festival, USA
 Trikone Festival, USA
 New Orleans Film Festival, USA
 Toronto Inside Out Film Festival, Canada
 Regent Park Film Festival, Canada
 Leeds Film Festival, UK
 Bite the Mango Festival, UK
 Travelling Film Festival of the British Film Institute. UK
 Screenings at Pioneer Theatre, and the Queens Museum of Art, New York .Daughters of the Late Colonel screened at:
 KaraFilm Festival, PakistanRamchand Pakistani'' Official Selection at:
 Tribeca Film Festival
 Seattle International Film Festival
 Osian Film Festival
 Rhode Island International Film Festival
 Pusan International Film Festival
 London International Film Festival
 South Asian International Film Festival
 Third I Film Festival, San Francisco
 Cairo International Film Festival
 Dubai International Film Festival
 Kerala Film Festival
 Fribourg Film Festival

Lala Begum screened at: 
 Jagran Film Festival, Delhi, India
 MISAAF Film Festival, Canada
 Dallas South Asian Film Festival, USA
 Washington DC South Asian Film Festival, USA (Winner, Best Story)

Dobara Phir Se screened at: 
 Chicago South Asian Film Festival, USA
 Tasveer Seattle South Asian Film Festival, USA

References

External links
 Mehreen Jabbar's – Official website
 

1971 births
Living people
Film directors from Karachi
Pakistani film producers
Pakistani television producers
Pakistani women film directors
UCLA Film School alumni
Pakistani people of Hyderabadi descent
Women television producers
Muhajir people
People from Karachi
St Joseph's Convent School, Karachi alumni